Lyallpur Khalsa College is a multi-faculty co-educational college located in Jalandhar, Punjab. The college is one of the biggest colleges in region in context of student strength, academic courses offered and co-curricular and sports achievements. The college is affiliated to Guru Nanak Dev University, Amritsar. Currently, Dr. Gurpinder Singh Samra is the principal of the college.

History

The college began its life journey in Lyallpur (present-day Faisalabad) in undivided Punjab with the establishment of Khalsa High School in 1908. The philanthropists of the city donated land and other resources for the establishment of the school. Noted Sikh statesman Master Tara Singh served as the first headmaster of the school and it was here that he got the title of 'Master' prefixed to his name. The school was later upgraded to a degree college in 1928.
The bloody partition of the country led to reestablishment of the college in Jalandhar in 1947-48. Government Municipal Degree College, Faisalabad is now housed in the former premises of Lyallpur Khalsa College. Although much of the possessions of the institution remained behind, the college was still able to bring along a number of books from its library. Soon after its migration to Jalandhar, the college started post graduation in Punjabi and became the first college in the region to offer MA Punjabi. The affiliation of the college was transferred from Punjab University to Guru Nanak Dev University in 1969-70.
The college is managed by a Governing Council which has been headed by key political figures Swaran Singh, the former Minister of External Affairs in the Government of India and S. Balbir Singh, former Member Rajyasabha and Loksabha. Currently, Mrs. Balbir Kaur is the president of the College Governing council.

Achievements
The college is one of the pioneer colleges in Punjab in the context of education in Computers, Biotechnology and Physiotherapy. It now offers a range of over 40 courses at degree, diploma and certificate levels in Arts, Commerce, Science, Computer and Physiotherapy Streams. 
The college has won the Overall Sports Championship of Guru Nanak Dev University for 21 times out of which it has been won for 11 times consecutively. The college has won the Overall Cultural Championship of the university.
The college was accredited as A+ grade college by the National Assessment and Accreditation Council in 2003. In 2011, the college was reaccredited as A grade college with a CGPA of 3.74. The College has been recognised as the College with Potential for Excellence by the University Grants Commission.

Notable faculty
 S. Balwant Singh Anand
 Prof. Ram Singh Sachdev
 S Pritam Singh Gill
 Dr. Baldev Singh Dhillon
 Dr. Surinder Mand
 Dr. Harjinder Singh
 Dr. Sukhdev Singh Nagra
 Dr. Gurpinder Singh Samra
 Dr. Daya Singh Sandhu

Hind Rattan Awardee (2014); Fulbright Senior Research Scholar (2002) for Punjab University, Chandigarh. Fulbright-Nehru Research Scholar (Guru Nanak Dev University). Distinguished Professor of Research and Former Chairman (Educational & Counseling Psychology Department), University of Louisville,  Kentucky, USA. Founder and Executive Director, Association of Mental Health Counseling (India). Elected President: Association for Multicultural Counseling and Development. Published more than a dozen books, 60 book chapters and more than 50 journal articles in the field of professional counseling and psychotherapy. Presently serving as the Director of Research and Professor of Counselor Education and Supervision at Lindsey Wilson College. Kentucky Counseling Association a new research award in Dr. Daya Singh Sandhu's name on 20 May 2014, to be called, "Dr. Daya Singh Sandhu Award in Research and Innovation in Counseling."  Dr. Daya Singh Sandhu professor and Director of Research at Lindsey Wilson College at Columbia, KY was honored with the 2021 ACES Lifetime Achievement Award  on October 9, 2021, at Atlanta, Georgia for his major contributions to the field of mental health counseling.

Notable alumni

 Prithviraj Kapoor, actor
 Ajit Pal Singh, captain, Indian National Hockey Team 
 Pargat Singh, captain, Indian National Hockey Team
 S.Buta Singh, former Union Minister
 S. Balbir Singh, former Member Parliament 
 Surjit Singh Randhawa, hockey player
 Malkit Singh Punjabi singer
 Sarbjit Cheema, Punjabi singer 
 Dr. Daya Singh Sandhu, academician
 Surjit Singh Minhas, former Speaker, Punjab State

See also
 Government Municipal Degree College, Faisalabad

References

External links
 Official website

Universities and colleges in Punjab, India
Education in Jalandhar
Educational institutions established in 1908
1908 establishments in India